Oliver Roth may refer to:
 Oliver Roth (badminton)
 Oliver Roth (footballer)